A referendum on a tax law was held in Liechtenstein on 24 December 1922. It was approved by 59.6% of voters.

Results

References

1922 referendums
1922 in Liechtenstein
Referendums in Liechtenstein
December 1922 events